Col. Isaac Beeson House is a historic home located near Colfax, Guilford County, North Carolina. It was built about 1790, and is a two-story, three-bay, Federal style brick dwelling with a Quaker plan.  It has single shoulder exterior end chimneys and a one-story gable roofed wing.

It was listed on the National Register of Historic Places in 1980.

References

Houses on the National Register of Historic Places in North Carolina
Federal architecture in North Carolina
Houses completed in 1790
Houses in Guilford County, North Carolina
National Register of Historic Places in Guilford County, North Carolina